The Karoo and Ferrar Large Igneous Provinces (LIPs) are two large igneous provinces in Southern Africa and Antarctica respectively, collectively known as the Karoo-Ferrar, Gondwana, or Southeast African LIP, associated with the initial break-up of the Gondwana supercontinent at  .
Its flood basalt mostly covers South Africa and Antarctica but portions extend further into southern Africa and into South America, India, Australia and New Zealand.

Karoo-Ferrar formed just prior to the breakup of Gondwana in the Lower Jurassic epoch, about 183 million years ago; this timing corresponds to the early Toarcian anoxic event and the Pliensbachian-Toarcian extinction. It covered about 3 x 106 km2. The total original volume of the flow, which extends over a distance in excess of 6000 km (4000 km  in Antarctica alone), was in excess of 2.5 x 106 km³ (2.5 million cubic kilometres).

The Ferrar LIP is notable for long distance transport and the Karoo LIP for its large volume and chemical diversity. 

The igneous activity of the Karoo LIP began   at the northern margin of the province. The long-lasting Chon-Aike Province in Patagonia, the Antarctic Peninsula, and Ellsworth Land was activated   in an unstable tectonic environment in which both extension and subduction occurred. By  the Karoo magmatism had spread to Namibia, Lesotho, Lebombo, and the Ferrar province in Antarctica. The Karoo LIP ended  with peripheral eruptions in Patagonia, the Antarctica Peninsula, northern South Africa, Kerala in India, and southeast Australia. The Karoo Province uplifted southern Africa c.  and broke East Gondwana (India, Antarctica, and Australia) away from West Gondwana (South America and Africa) beginning in the opening of the Weddell Sea.

In the Cretaceous, some 15 million years after the last Karoo eruption, renewed magmatism was initiated between Mary Byrd Land in Antarctica and New Zealand from where it spread along Gondwana's southern margin, from eastern Australia to the Antarctic Peninsula.  Isotopic dating suggests a series of igneous events at 133–131, 124–119, and 113–107 Ma in Australia; 110–99 Ma in Mary Byrd Land; 114-109 and 82 Ma in New Zealand; and 141 and 127 Ma in the Antarctic Peninsula.  This phase of magmatism resulted in extension and rift between Australia and Antarctica, Australia and Lord Howe Rise, and Mary Byrd Land and New Zealand.

Ferrar Supergroup
According to Robert John Pankhurst, "The Ferrar Supergroup is well known as being representative of a Middle Jurassic (and partly later), Gondwana-wide continental flood basalts event which includes Tasmanian dolerites, the Karoo Supergroup of southern Africa and the Serra Geral basalts of central South America."  These continental tholeiites are indicative of a large-scale extensional rift system and associated Middle Jurassic magmatic activity linked to the break-up of Gondwana 25 m.y. later, when East Antarctica separated from Africa, and the Mozambique Basin opened.  Included in the supergroup are the Ferrar Dolerite sills and dykes, the Kirkpatrick Basalts, and the volcanogenic Carapace Sandstone and Mawson Formation.

See also
 
 Chon Aike Formation

References
 Notes

 Sources

 
 
 
 
 

Large igneous provinces
Flood basalts
Jurassic volcanism
Volcanism of Antarctica
Volcanism of Australia (continent)
Volcanism of India
Volcanism of South Africa
Volcanism of South America
Volcanism of New Zealand